The 2010 FIBA Europe Under-16 Championship was the 24th edition of the FIBA Europe Under-16 Championship. 16 teams featured the competition, held in Montenegro from August 5–15. Spain was the defending champion. This year's edition was won by Croatia

Teams

Group stages

Preliminary round
In this round, the sixteen teams were allocated in four groups of four teams each. The top three qualified for the qualifying round. The last team of each group played for the 13th–16th place in the Classification Games. 

Times given below are in CEST (UTC+2).

Group A

Group B

Group C

Group D

Qualifying round
The twelve teams remaining were allocated in two groups of six teams each. The four top teams advanced to the quarterfinals. The last two teams of each group played for the 9th–12th place.

Group E

Group F

Classification round
The last teams of each group in the preliminary round will compete in this Classification Round. The four teams will play in one group. The last two teams will be relegated to Division B for the next season.

Group G

Knockout round

Championship

Quarterfinals

Semifinals

Bronze medal game

Final

5th–8th playoffs

5th–8th semifinals

7th place playoff

5th place playoff

9th–12th playoffs

9th–12th semifinals

11th place playoff

9th place playoff

Final standings

Team roster
Mislav Brzoja, Martin Junaković, Karlo Lebo, Ivan Jukić, Dino Šamanić, Dario Šarić, Dominik Mavra, Antonio Črnjević, Tomislav Radoš, Nikola Urli, Daniel Zovko, Filip Bundović
Head coach: Dražen Brajković

Awards

Most Valuable Player

 Dario Šarić

All-Tournament Team

 Josep Perez
 Nikola Ivanović
 Tayfun Erüklü
 Dario Šarić
 Nikola Janković

Statistical leaders

Points

Rebounds

Assists

Blocks

Steals

External links
FIBA Archive
Official Site

FIBA U16 European Championship
2010–11 in European basketball
2010–11 in Montenegrin basketball
International youth basketball competitions hosted by Montenegro